Roy Albert Rodda (9 May 1910 – 10 February 1978) was an  Australian rules footballer who played with Hawthorn in the Victorian Football League (VFL).

Rodda was recruited to Hawthorn from Shepparton where his father was a well known painter and decorator.

Rodda later served in the Australian Army during World War II.

Notes

External links 

1910 births
1978 deaths
Australian rules footballers from Victoria (Australia)
Hawthorn Football Club players
Shepparton Football Club players